GCH Retail (Malaysia) Sdn Bhd (doing business as Giant Hypermarket) is a hypermarket and retailer chain now mainly in Malaysia, Singapore, Brunei and Cambodia, and formerly Indonesia and Vietnam. In 2016, Giant was the largest supermarket chain in Malaysia.

History

Giant was founded in 1944 as a small grocery store in Kuala Lumpur and expanded with the opening of the Teng Minimarket Centre (TMC) in Bangsar in 1974. In 1999, Dairy Farm International Holdings bought a 90% interest in the chain, with the Teng family retaining the balance. By 2003, the holding company for the chain had changed its name to Dairy Farm Giant Retail Sdn Bhd, and the chain had eight Giant hypermarkets and 10 supermarkets as well as three Cold Storage supermarkets. Today, the company operates as a subsidiary of Dairy Farm International Holdings Limited and the name was changed to GCH Retail (Malaysia) Sdn Bhd.

GCH Retail is 30%-owned by Syarikat Pesaka Antah Sdn Bhd — a company controlled by the Negeri Sembilan royal family and balance 70% by DFI Mauritius Ltd.

In December 2011, Giant expanded into Vietnam. However, in February 2018, the Group disposed of its 100% interest in Asia Investment Supermarket Trading Co. Ltd. (AISTC), operating a hypermarket in Vietnam to Auchan Retail Vietnam, for net cash inflow of US$6.4 million. As such, the Group has exited from supermarket and hypermarket business in Vietnam.

Beginning 2017, Giant and its peers in the hypermarket retail segment in Malaysia had been underperforming due to high operational costs, weakening consumer spending, and stiffer competition from smaller supermarkets, retailers and e-commerce. In 2019, it closed at least six outlets in Peninsular Malaysia operations. It comprises 2 hypermarkets & 2 Cold Storage outlets in Selangor, 1 each in Kedah, Perak, and Kuala Lumpur. While exiting totally from Sabah and Sarawak. There had about 16 stores in both of the states which they transferred the business to local stores as new owners rather than closing them permanently. In 2020, Many branches would be replaced by TF Value-Mart or NSK Trade City.

Similar downsize also observed in Singapore with the closure of two stores located at Bukit Panjang and Jalan Tenteram in Whampoa estate, and its VivoCity hypermarket in 2019. It also closed its Parkway Parade hypermarket on 29 February 2020.

In May 2021, Giant announced its withdrawal from Indonesia since 31 July 2021. Some branches would be replaced with Hero Supermarket and IKEA small stores. Hero is also owned by the DFI Retail Group.

Rebranding 
On 24 September 2020, Giant Singapore announced that it would be undertaking a rebranding exercise, introducing a new logo and new features to its stores. It will also lower prices of daily essentials by 20% average for six months, following NTUC FairPrice's decision to lower prices in order to support Singaporeans during the COVID-19 pandemic.

The rebranding of Giant's logo was extended to Malaysia in April 2021. As part of transformation, Giant introduces a section known as “Ringgit Zone” which has priced its products fixed at RM3 per item for bargain hunters. Both ShopSmart & G-Ekspres are being rebranded as Giant Mini.

See also 
 List of hypermarkets in Malaysia
List of companies in Malaysia

References

External links 

 Giant Malaysia
 Giant Singapore
 Giant Indonesia
 GCH Retail (Malaysia) Sdn Bhd Company Profile on Bloomberg L.P.

Hypermarkets
Supermarkets of Malaysia
Supermarkets of Singapore
Supermarkets of Indonesia
Malaysian brands
Retail companies established in 1944
Malaysian subsidiaries of foreign companies
DFI Retail Group
Privately held companies of Malaysia
1944 establishments in the Japanese colonial empire